Apomecyna is a genus of beetle in the family Cerambycidae, containing over 80 species worldwide, primarily in the Old World.

Species

 Apomecyna acutipennis Kolbe, 1893
 Apomecyna adspersaria Breuning, 1942
 Apomecyna alboannulata Breuning, 1938
 Apomecyna albovaria Breuning, 1954
 Apomecyna angolensis Breuning, 1950
 Apomecyna atomaria Pascoe, 1858
 Apomecyna binubila Pascoe, 1858
 Apomecyna bisignata Breuning, 1952
 Apomecyna bivittata Breuning, 1938
 Apomecyna bizonata Breuning, 1969
 Apomecyna bremeri Breuning, 1982
 Apomecyna brunnea Hintz, 1919
 Apomecyna cavifrons Thomson, 1868
 Apomecyna ceylonica Breuning, 1938
 Apomecyna cochinchinensis Breuning, 1982
 Apomecyna collarti Breuning, 1948
 Apomecyna corrugata Breuning, 1938
 Apomecyna cretacea (Hope, 1831)
 Apomecyna curticornis Breuning, 1960
 Apomecyna densemaculata Breuning, 1938
 Apomecyna endroedyi Breuning, 1972
 Apomecyna excavata Breuning, 1938
 Apomecyna excavatipennis Breuning, 1969
 Apomecyna fallaciosa Breuning, 1938
 Apomecyna flavoguttulata Aurivillius, 1916
 Apomecyna flavomarmorata Breuning, 1938
 Apomecyna flavovittata Chiang, 1963
 Apomecyna gracillima (Breuning, 1938)
 Apomecyna hauseri Breuning, 1960
 Apomecyna histrio (Fabricius, 1793)
 Apomecyna holorufipennis Breuning, 1977
 Apomecyna kochi Breuning, 1962
 Apomecyna lameerei (Pic, 1895)
 Apomecyna latefasciata Quedenfeldt, 1885
 Apomecyna leleupi Breuning, 1960
 Apomecyna leucosticta (Hope, 1831)
 Apomecyna longicollis Pic, 1925
 Apomecyna longipennis Thomson, 1858
 Apomecyna luteomaculata (Pic, 1925)
 Apomecyna luzonica Breuning, 1938
 Apomecyna mindanaonis Breuning, 1980
 Apomecyna minima Breuning, 1938
 Apomecyna naevia Bates, 1873
 Apomecyna nigritarsis Gahan, 1900
 Apomecyna nigroapicalis Aurivillius, 1907
 Apomecyna nimbae Lepesme & Breuning, 1952
 Apomecyna obliquata Klug, 1833
 Apomecyna obliquevitticollis Breuning, 1968
 Apomecyna papuana Breuning, 1943
 Apomecyna paraguttifera Breuning, 1977
 Apomecyna parisii (Breuning, 1940)
 Apomecyna parumguttata Breuning, 1938
 Apomecyna parumpunctata Chevrolat, 1856
 Apomecyna porphyrea Montrouzier, 1855
 Apomecyna proxima Breuning, 1938
 Apomecyna quadrisignata Quedenfeldt, 1885
 Apomecyna quadristicta Kolbe, 1894
 Apomecyna reducta Breuning, 1939
 Apomecyna rufipennis Pic, 1935
 Apomecyna rufomarmorata Breuning, 1973
 Apomecyna salomonum Breuning, 1938
 Apomecyna saltator (Fabricius, 1787)
 Apomecyna sarasinorum Heller, 1916
 Apomecyna scalaris Audinet-Serville, 1835
 Apomecyna scorteccii Breuning, 1968
 Apomecyna semihistrio Kusama & Takakuwa, 1984
 Apomecyna somaliensis Breuning, 1948
 Apomecyna stramentosa Breuning, 1938
 Apomecyna subcavifrons Breuning, 1954
 Apomecyna tigrina Thomson, 1857
 Apomecyna trifasciata Quedenfeldt, 1883
 Apomecyna triseriata Aurivillius, 1907
 Apomecyna usambarica Breuning, 1961
 Apomecyna vaneyeni Breuning, 1952
 Apomecyna varia Blanchard, 1851
 Apomecyna vitticollis Breuning, 1939

References

Apomecynini
Cerambycidae genera